The matutinal flower moth (Schinia mitis) is a moth of the family Noctuidae. It is found from central Florida, north to Georgia and west to eastern Texas.

Adults are on wing from April to June, but there are also records from September and November. It is a day flying moth, which is only active for a few hours in the morning, when the flowers of its host plant are open.

The larvae feed on Pyrrhopappus species.

External links
Images
Butterflies and Moths of North America
Biology and immature stages of Schinia mitis
Adaptation of the Life History of Schinia mitis to its host plant Pyrrhopappus

Schinia
Moths of North America
Moths described in 1873